Mount Idaho can refer to the following features in Idaho, United States:
Mount Idaho (mountain), a peak in the Lost River Range
Mount Idaho, Idaho, a ghost town